Khlong Chong Nonsi is a khlong (canal) in Bangkok's economic and financial district as well as the nearby Khlong Sathon.

Khlong Chong Nonsi runs from Surawong road all the way down to the Chao Phraya river. It covers a distance of  through districts of Bang Rak, Sathon and Yan Nawa. It is also the origin of the name Chong Nonsi. One of the two khwaengs (sub-district) in Yan Nawa district, where it empties into the Chao Phraya river. Currently, it runs parallel to the entire length of Narathiwat Ratchanakarin road. Somephases it crosses with other roads such as Chan, Rama III. The BTS SkyTrain Silom Line is at the northern end and the BRT bus runs up and down most of the canal.

Its name "Chong Nonsi" is believed to be distorted from the word "Chong Nang Ni" (ช่องนางหนี) which means "a channel that lady escaped". It comes from a folklore titled "Legend of Lord U Thong", the story about an Ayutthaya mythical king named U Thong, who escaped cholera to various places and gave rise to the names of different places later on.

A 2018 survey found that Khlong Chong Nonsi, especially the intersection of Silom and Surawong roads, was the dirtiest in Bangkok.

Chong Nonsi Canal Park 

On December 25, 2021, the Chong Nonsi Canal Park was opened by Bangkok Metropolitan Administration (BMA). The construction period is divided into four phases.

Notes

References

Yan Nawa district
Sathon district
Bang Rak district
Canals in Thailand
Geography of Bangkok